The Mack Valueliner is a heavy-duty truck that was introduced by Mack Trucks in 1986 to replace the Mack R  model. Its production lasted for 6 years until it was replaced by the CHR & CLR models.

The E6 and E7 powered Valueliners featured a flat bonnet and 2 piece mudguards while E9 V8 powered versions had a sloped bonnet and a raised cab. As with most Macks at the time, all valueliners came out of the factory with air starter motors.

See also 
List of Mack Trucks products
Mack Super-Liner
Mack Trucks

References

External links
Mack Super-Liner Homepage - Mack Trucks Australia

Valueliner
Vehicles introduced in 1986